The city of Mahmud-i-Raqi is the capital of Kapisa Province and center of Mahmud Raqi District in Afghanistan. It has a population of 50,490 and is made up of four districts. Mahmood Raqi, located to the northeast of Kabul, is classified as an urban village. It is approximately 70 km from
Kabul and 20 km to Charikar.

On 15 August 2021, Mahmud-i-Raqi was seized by Taliban fighters, becoming the thirtieth provincial capital to be captured by the Taliban as part of the wider 2021 Taliban offensive.

Climate
Mahmud-i-Raqi has a hot-summer humid continental climate (Köppen Dsa). At  on average, January is the coldest month of the year.

Land use
It has a total land area of 3,970 hectares. The total number of dwellings in Mahmud-i-Raqi is 5,610.

Agriculture is the dominant land use at 72%. Dwellings are dispersed throughout
the municipality with low density and consisting entirely of irregular houses.

See also
Kapisa Women's Center

References

Populated places in Kapisa Province
Provincial capitals in Afghanistan